The 2018 Fiji Premier League was the 42nd season of the Fiji Premier League (Vodafone Premier League for sponsorship reasons), the top-tier football league in Fiji organized by the Fiji Football Association since its establishment in 1977. It started on 14 January 2018.

Team changes

To Fiji Premier League

Promoted from 2017 Fiji Super Premier Division
 Tavua

From Fiji Premier League

Relegated to 2018 Fiji Super Premier Division
 Rakiraki

Teams

Stadiums and locations

Standings

Top scorers

References

Fiji Premier League seasons
Fiji
Premier League